Roos is a surname with multiple origins.  In Dutch, Low German,  Swiss German and Estonian “Roos” means “Rose” and the surname is often of toponymic origin (e.g. someone lived in a house named “the rose”) In 2007, 8600 people were named Roos and another 2880 “de Roos” in the Netherlands. In the UK, Roos may be of patronymic origin (“Andrews”) or indicating red hair (Old English “Rouse”). The name is also relatively common in Sweden (5,902 people in 2010), Finland (1219 in 2012) and Estonia (934 people in 2019).
People with the name "Roos" or "de Roos" include:

Academics 
 Anna Maria Roos (1862–1938), Swedish educator, author, theosophist and songwriter
  (1877–1953), Dutch philologist
  (1937–2010), Swedish theoretical chemist
 Charles F. Roos (1901–1958), American economist
 Folkert de Roos (1920–2000), Dutch economist
 Göran Roos, Swedish business theorist
 J P Roos (b. 1945), Finnish sociologist
 Johan Roos (born 1961), Swedish organizational theorist

Arts 
 Alexander Roos (c. 1810–1881), Italian-born British architect and urban planner
 Bellan Roos (1901–1990), Swedish actress
 Cajetan Roos (1690–1770), Italian landscape painter, son of Philipp Peter
 Camilla Overbye Roos (b. 1969), Danish film actress
 Cornelis Sebille Roos (1754–1820), Dutch art dealer 
 Don Roos (born 1959), American screenwriter and film director
  (born 1949), Dutch draughtsman and sculptor
 Enn Roos (1908–1990), Estonian Soviet sculptor
 Eva Roos (1872–1956), British children's books illustrator 
 Ewa Roos (born 1949), Swedish singer and actress
 Fred Roos (born 1934), American film producer
 Graham Roos (b. 1966), British producer, writer and performer
 Jaime Roos (b. 1953), Uruguayan musician
 Jan Roos (c.1591-1638), Flemish painter who worked in Italy as Giovanni Rosa
 Jennifer Roos (b. 1971), American basketball coach
 Joanna Roos (1901–1989), American actress and playwright
 Johann Heinrich Roos (1631–1685), German painter, father of Philipp Peter and Johann Melchior
 Johann Melchior Roos (1663–1731), German painter, son of Johann Heinrich
 Joseph Roos (1726–1805), Austrian painter, son of Cajetan
 Kjell Roos (b. 1965), Swedish guitarist and singer
 Martin Roos (b. 1972), Swedish guitarist and manager of Kent
 Mathilda Roos (1852–1908), Swedish writer
 Mary Roos (b. 1949), German singer and actor
 Philipp Peter Roos (1655–1706), German painter, son of Johann Heinrich
 Rosalie Roos (1899–1982), American jeweller and silversmith
 S.H. de Roos (1877–1962), Dutch type and book cover designer and artist
 Stefan Roos (b. 1970), Swedish actor and screenwriter
 Theodor Roos (1638–1698), German painter, brother of Johann Heinrich
  (b. 1964), Dutch jazz saxophonist and composer
 William Roos (1808–1878), Welsh painter and engraver

Military 
 Axel Erik Roos (1684–1765), Swedish general
 Carl Gustaf Roos (1655–1702), Swedish general
 George Roos-Keppel (1866v1921), British military officer
 Helm Roos (1930–1992), South African general
 Margareta Elisabeth Roos (1696–1772), Swedish-Estonian cross-dressing female in the Swedish army

Politics 
 Ants Roos (1885–1962), Estonian politician
 John Roos (b. 1955), American diplomat, former Ambassador to Japan
  (1878–1940), Alsace politician
 Lawrence K. Roos (1918–2005), American (Missouri) banker and politician
 Mike Roos (b. 1946), American (Californian) politician
 Reet Roos (born 1973), Estonian politician
 Thea de Roos (b. 1949), Dutch historian and politician
 Tielman Roos (1879–1935), South African politician

Sports 
 Aat de Roos (1919–1992), Dutch field hockey player
 Angelica Roos (b. 1989), Swedish weightlifter
 Ann-Sofi Roos (b. 1959), Swedish Olympic swimmer 
 Axel Roos (b. 1964), German football player and coach
 Bertil Roos (1943–2016), Formula One driver from Sweden
 Céline Roos (1953–2021), French and Canadian chess player
 Daniël Roos (b. 1959), French chess master
 David Roos (b. 1982), South African paralympian athlete
 De Wet Roos (b. 1990), South African-born Australian rugby player
 Elena Roos (b. 1991), Swiss orienteer
 Elisandro Naressi Roos (b. 1976), a.k.a. Santiago, Brazilian footballer
 Fanny Roos (b. 1995), Swedish shot putter
 Gerrit Roos (1898 –1969), Dutch weightlifter
 JC Roos (b. 1990), South African rugby player
 Jake Roos (b. 1980), South African golfer
 Janek Roos (born 1974), Danish badminton player
 Jordan Roos (b. 1953), American football player
 Kelle Roos (b. 1992), Dutch footballer
 Louis Roos (b. 1957), French chess player
 Michael Roos (b. 1982), Estonian-born American football player
 Michel Roos (1932–2002), French chess player
 Nadine Roos (b. 1996), South African rugby union and sevens
 Nancy Roos (1905–1957), American chess player
 Nel Roos-Lodder (1914–1996), Dutch discus thrower
 Paul Roos (1880–1948), South African rugby player, first Springbok captain
 Paul Roos (b. 1963), Australian rules football player and coach
 Suzy Powell-Roos (b. 1976), American discus thrower
 Swede Roos (1913–1979), American professional basketball player and coach

Other 
 Barney Roos (1888–1960), American automotive engineer
 Charlotta Roos (1771–1809), Swedish occult medium
 Christian Roos (1826-1896), German Roman Catholic bishop
 Jan Roos (b. 1977), Dutch columnist
  (1922–1998), Danish documentary filmmaker
  (1727–1803), German theologian
 Martin Roos (b. 1942), Romanian Roman Catholic bishop
 Rachel Roos (1923–1989), Dutch World War II resistance fighter
 Robert de Roos (c.1170-1227), ancestor of the Barons Ros of Helmsley
 Rosalie Roos (1823–1898), Swedish feminist activist and writer
 Victor Roos (1888–1964), American founder of several aircraft companies, including Cessna
 Wilhelm Roos (1858–1944), Finnish Lutheran clergyman and politician
 Willem Roos (1882–1915), Dutch World War I spy for Germany executed in England

See also
 Roos (disambiguation) 
 Roos af Hjelmsäter Swedish noble family of Norwegian origin
 Roo (disambiguation)
 Rose (surname)

References

Germanic-language surnames
Dutch-language surnames
Estonian-language surnames
Swedish-language surnames

de:Roos
fr:Roos
it:Roos
fi:Roos